Evil Activities is a hardcore techno music DJ group formed in 1998 in the Netherlands. The two original members were Telly Luyks and Kelly van Soest, however it now only consists of Kelly van Soest. In 2016, E-Life joined Evil Activities.

Evil Activities released three music albums: Dedicated (2003), Evilution (2008), and Extreme Audio (2012); their notable works are: Nobody Said It Was Easy, Evil Inside and Broken. Kelly van Soest hosts an episodic live streamed DJ set named Extreme Audio.

Together with the MC E-Life, he performs at music festivals across the globe such as Qlimax, Sensation Black, Dominator, Defqon.1, Masters of Hardcore and Decibel.

Albums
 Dedicated, 2003
 Evilution, 2008
 Extreme Audio, 2012
 Evil's Greatest Activities, 2013

References

External links

Official website

Dutch dance music groups
Hardcore techno music groups